Es Bòrdes is a municipality in the comarca of the Aran Valley in Catalonia, Spain. The mayor is Rosa Mirat Marqués (UA). The municipality includes a small exclave to the west.

Subdivisions 
The municipality is composed of four distinct settlements.
Arró 
Begós
Benós
Es Bòrdes

References

External links
 Government data pages 

Municipalities in Val d'Aran